Udorsky District (Udora rajon) is an administrative district (raion), one of the twelve in the Komi Republic, Russia. It is located in the west of the republic. Its administrative center is the rural locality (a selo) of Koslan. As of the 2010 Census, the total population of the district was 20,400, with the population of Koslan accounting for 11.2% of that number.

History of the name
The name Udoria in the full official title of the Russian Tsars refers to Udora in the East of Komi, a salient into Arkhangelsk Oblast of Russia in the basin of the Vashka and Mezen Rivers.

Administrative and municipal status
Within the framework of administrative divisions, Udorsky District is one of the twelve in the Komi Republic. It is divided into three urban-type settlement administrative territories (Blagoyevo, Mezhdurechensk, and Usogorsk), nine selo administrative territories, and three settlement administrative territories, all of which comprise fifty-two rural localities. As a municipal division, the district is incorporated as Udorsky Municipal District. The three urban-type settlement administrative territories are incorporated into three urban settlements, and the twelve remaining administrative territories are incorporated into twelve rural settlements within the municipal district. The selo of Koslan serves as the administrative center of both the administrative and municipal district.

References

Notes

Sources

Districts of the Komi Republic
